A list of films produced by the Israeli film industry in 2000.

2000 releases

Unknown premiere date

Awards

Notable deaths

 February 23 – Ofra Haza, Israeli singer and actress (b. 1957)

See also
2000 in Israel

References

External links
 Israeli films of 2000 at the Internet Movie Database

Lists of 2000 films by country or language
Film
2000